Barbara Wolfe is an economist and the Richard A. Easterlin Professor of Economics, Population Health Sciences, and Public Affairs at the University of Wisconsin–Madison.

Wolfe is also a Faculty Affiliate at the Institute for Research on Poverty. She is a research associate at the NBER, and the Levy Institute of Bard College. She is also an Emeritus Fellow at the Institute of Labor Economics (IZA).

She obtained her PhD from the University of Pennsylvania.

Research 
Wolfe's research mainly focuses on health economics and the Economics of Poverty. Her works have been quote more than 19900 times according to Google Scholar.
She is a member of the National Academy of Medicine.

She has published in the Journal of Economic Literature, the American Economic Review, Demography and the Journal of Human Resources.

Her research has been featured in NPR, The Atlantic, and VICE.

Selected bibliography 

 Haveman, Robert; Wolfe, Barbara (1995). "The Determinants of Children's Attainments: A Review of Methods and Findings". Journal of Economic Literature.
 Summers, Anita A.; Wolfe, Barbara L. (1977). "A Comment on Summers and Wolfe: Reply". The Journal of Human Resources. 12 (3): 406. 
 Haveman, Robert H.; Wolfe, Barbara L. (1984). "Schooling and Economic Well-Being: The Role of Nonmarket Effects". The Journal of Human Resources. 19 (3): 377.
 Haveman, Robert; Wolfe, Barbara; Spaulding, James (1991). "Childhood Events and Circumstances Influencing High School Completion". Demography. 28 (1): 133.
 Haveman, Robert H.; Wolfe, Barbara L., Succeeding Generations: On the Effects of Investments in Children, New York: Russell Sage Foundation, 1994 (Paperback edition, 1995).
 Summers, Anita A.; Wolfe, Barbara L.“Do Schools Make a Difference?”, American Economic Review, 67(4): 639–652, September 1977
 Haveman, Robert H.; Wolfe, Barbara L. Disability Transfers and Early Retirement: A Causal Relationship?”, Journal of Public Economics, 24: 47–66, 1984.
 Behrman, Jere R.; Wolfe, Barbara L. "Determinants of Women’s Health Status and Health‑Care Utilization in a Developing Country: A Latent Variable Approach," Review of Economics and Statistics, 66 (4), 1984.
 de Jong, Philip; Haveman, Robert H.; Wolfe, Barbara L. “Disability Transfers and the Work Decision of Older Men,” Quarterly Journal of Economics, 939–949. August, 1991
 Haveman, Robert H.; Wolfe, Barbara L.“Children’s Prospects and Children’s Policy,”  Journal of Economic Perspectives, 7(4): 153–174, 1993.
 Hill, Steven; Wolfe, Barbara L. “The Effect of Health on the Work Effort of Single Mothers,” Journal of Human Resources, 30(1): 42–62, 1995.
 An, Chong Bum, Ginther, Donna;  Haveman, Robert H.; Wolfe, Barbara L.“The ‘Window Problem’ in Studies of Children's Attainments: A Methodological Exploration,” Journal of the American Statistical Association, September, 1996
 Fletcher, Jason; Vidal-Fernandez, Marian; Wolfe, Barbara L. “Dynamic and Heterogenous Effects of Sibling Death on Children’s Outcomes.” PNAS. January 2018. 115-120
 Hair, Nicole; Hanson, Hanson, James; Pollak, Seth; Wolfe. Barbara L.“Association of Child Poverty, Brain Development, and Academic Achievement”  JAMA Pediatrics. 2015;169(9)

References 

Living people
University of Pennsylvania School of Arts and Sciences alumni
Year of birth missing (living people)
University of Wisconsin–Madison faculty
21st-century American economists
20th-century American economists
American women economists
20th-century American women
21st-century American women